Eric A. Kimmel (born 1946) is an American author of more than 50 children's books. His works include Caldecott Honor Book Hershel and the Hanukkah Goblins (illustrated by Trina Schart Hyman), Sydney Taylor Book Award winners The Chanukkah Guest and Gershon's Monster, and Simon and the Bear: A Hanukkah Tale.

Kimmel was born in Brooklyn, New York and earned a bachelor's degree in English literature from Lafayette College in 1967, a master's degree from New York University, and a PhD in Education from the University of Illinois in 1973. He taught at Indiana University at South Bend, and at Portland State University, where he is Professor Emeritus of Education.

Kimmel lives with his wife, Doris, in Portland, Oregon.

Awards 

 2004: National Jewish Book Award for Wonders and Miracles: A Passover Companion
2008: National Jewish Book Award in the Illustrated Children's Book category for The Mysterious Guests: A Sukkot Story. Illustration by Katya Krenina
2011: National Jewish Book Award in the Illustrated Children's Book category for The Golem's Latkes Illustration by Aaron Jasinski
2013: National Jewish Book Award in the Illustrated Children's Book category for Hanukkah Bear Illustration by Mike Wohnoutka

References

Living people
1946 births
American children's writers
University of Illinois alumni
New York University alumni
Lafayette College alumni
Writers from Portland, Oregon
Portland State University faculty
Jewish American writers
Date of birth missing (living people)
21st-century American Jews